Mulumba may refer to:

Given name:
Gérard Mulumba Kalemba (1937–2020), Congolese prelate of the Catholic Church
Mulumba Lukoji (1943–1997), Congolese politician
Mulumba Mukendi (born 1985), football striker from DR Congo

Surname:
Andy Mulumba (born 1990), Congolese-Canadian professional American football linebacker
Daniel Mulumba (1962–2012), the first Ugandan swimmer to compete at the Olympic Games
Felly Mulumba (born 1990), Congolese footballer
Fiston Mbaya Mulumba (born 1996), Congolese boxer
Ivan Matthias Mulumba, Ugandan writer and valuation surveyor
Kabongo Mulumba, Democratic Republic of the Congo karateka
Mabi Mulumba (born 1941), Congolese former politician
Matiya Mulumba (1836–1886), Ugandan Roman Catholic, one of the Martyrs of Uganda
Rémi Mulumba (born 1992), professional footballer
Tryphon Kin-Kiey Mulumba (born 1949), Congolese politician
Christophe Mulumba-Tshimanga (born 1993), professional Canadian football linebacker

See also
Knights of Saint Mulumba, founded in Nigeria in 1953, currently has over 10772 members
St. Matthias Mulumba Tindinyo Seminary, Kenya's National Theologicum Seminary for training Catholic clergy
Malamba
Malambo (disambiguation)
Malembo
Malimba (disambiguation)
Malimbe
Malombo
Mulamba